David Plombon was a former member of the Wisconsin State Assembly.

Biography
Plombon was born on May 27, 1961 in Stanley, Wisconsin. He attended the University of Wisconsin–Eau Claire and Milwaukee Area Technical College. Plombon had two children.

Plombon passed away on January 4, 2021.

Career
Plombon was elected to the Assembly in a special election in June 1993. He was a Democrat.  In that election, he defeated Wayne Laufenberg by 261 votes (4,161 to 3,900).

In the 1994 general election, Plombon again defeated Laufenberg, this time by a margin of 533 votes (7,750 to 7,217).

Plombon was arrested on March 30, 1994, and charged with misdemeanor disorderly conduct after his ex-wife reported to police that he rammed his car into the back of her car, called her vulgar names and threatened to kill her.

In the 1996 general election, Chuck Schaefer defeated Plombon by 1,252 votes (11,010 to 9,758)

References

People from Stanley, Wisconsin
Democratic Party members of the Wisconsin State Assembly
University of Wisconsin–Eau Claire alumni
Milwaukee Area Technical College alumni
1961 births
Living people